Alfred Edward Barbery (13 October 1884 – 23 May 1973) was an English cricketer.  Barbery was a right-handed batsman who bowled right-arm fast-medium.  He was born at Marylebone, London.

Barbery made two first-class appearances for Warwickshire, the first against Surrey in the 1906 County Championship, and the second against the touring South Africans in 1907, with both matches played at Edgbaston.  He had little success in his two first-class appearances, taking a total of 3 wickets at an average of 81.66, with best figures of 2/64, while with the bat, he scored 13 runs at a batting average of 4.33, with a high score of 6.

He died at Solihull, Warwickshire, on 23 May 1973.

References

External links
Alfred Barbery at ESPNcricinfo
Alfred Barbery at CricketArchive

1884 births
1973 deaths
People from Marylebone
English cricketers
Warwickshire cricketers